The contrabass sarrusophone is the deepest of the family of sarrusophones, and was made in three sizes. It was made in the 19th and early 20th centuries, primarily in Europe by Gautrot, Couesnon, Romeo Orsi, Rampone (and Cazzani), and Evette & Schaeffer (now Buffet Crampon), and in the United States by Conn, who built instruments in E♭ for US military bands.

Tone 
The EE♭ sarrusophone has the tone of a reedy contrabass saxophone, while the CC sarrusophone sounds much like the contrabassoon. The BB♭ contrabass sarrusophone is the lowest of the sarrusophones, and was the lowest-pitched wind instrument until the invention of the EEE♭ octocontra-alto and the BBB♭ octocontrabass clarinets, and the BB♭ subcontrabass tubax. Contrabass sarrusophones come in two bore widths: big pipes, which sound mellower and softer, but are still reedy; and small pipes, which are extremely reedy.

The EE and BB sarrusophones are transposing instruments.

The contrabass sarrusophone is sometimes confused with the reed contrabass, to which it bears a superficial resemblance.

Reed 
Contrabass sarrusophones take rather large reeds; they are larger than contrabassoon reeds.  This leads to most people making their own reeds (as is the practice of most oboe and bassoon players). Contrabass sarrusophone reeds are still manufactured by Vandoren. Sarrusophones are traditionally played with a double reed, but single reed mouthpieces have also been used. These mouthpieces are similar in size to soprano or alto saxophone mouthpieces.

Size 
Contrabass sarrusophones are comparatively light for contrabass instruments, weighing only about as much as a baritone saxophone, and being approximately four feet tall, about the same height as a bass saxophone. This makes them more convenient to hold, play and transport.

Use

Classical 
The sarrusophone is rarely scored in classical music today, but there are a few examples. Pieces written for it include Percy Grainger's Over the Hills and Far Away, Paderewski's Symphony in B Minor (Polonia), which called for three EE♭ contrabass sarrusophone players, Maurice Ravel's Rapsodie Espagnole, Sheherazade and L`heure espagnole, and Arrigo Boito's Nerone. Paul Dukas also used it in his orchestral tone poem The Sorcerer's Apprentice. Claude Debussy includes the CC instrument in Jeux, as does Frederick Delius in Eventyr, Requiem and Songs of Sunset. Jules Massenet writes for it in Esclarmonde. The instrument is given notable solos in Arnold Bax's First Symphony, written in 1921–22. Igor Stravinsky's first fully serial work, Threni (1958), a symphonic/choral setting of passages from the Latin Vulgate of the Book of Lamentations, includes a sarrusophone in its unusual scoring, which also features a solo Flugelhorn. American composer Barney Childs composed a chamber work, The Golden Bubble (1967), for EE♭ contrabass sarrusophone and one percussionist. Kaikhosru Shapurji Sorabji frequently utilized the contrabass sarrusophone, calling for it in his 1st, 4th, and 8th piano concertos, Opus clavisymphonicum for piano and orchestra, his two orchestral symphonies and the Messa grande sinfonica.

Jazz 
The song "Mandy Make Up Your Mind" recorded in 1924 with Clarence Williams and Louis Armstrong features an extended solo by Sidney Bechet on EEb Contrabass Sarrussophone and continues to feature him for approximately the last half of the song. On Frank Kimbrough’s 2018 album Monk's Dreams: The Complete Compositions of Thelonious Sphere Monk Scott Robinson plays contrabass sarrusophone on the tracks “Misterioso” and “Straight No Chaser”.

References

External links 
 The Sarrusophone

Sarrusophones
Single oboes with conical bore
Contrabass instruments